Lee Hyung-taik (born 3 January 1976) is a former professional tennis player from South Korea. He won one singles title and achieved a career-high singles ranking of world No. 36, in August 2007.

Personal life
Lee was born in a potato-farming village in Hoengseong County, South Korea. He began playing tennis at age nine with a school teacher. After retirement, he is running his own academy in Gangwon Province in the tennis center at Song-ahm Sports Town in Chuncheon named “Lee Hyung Taik Tennis Academy”, which opened on 12 September 2009.

Tennis career

2000
With the help of Coach Hee june Choi, Lee made a splash at the US Open tournament, reaching the fourth round before losing to Pete Sampras. En route to his fourth-round appearance against Sampras, Lee defeated Jeff Tarango, 13th seed Franco Squillari, and future Australian Open runner-up Rainer Schüttler.

2003
In 2003, Lee became the first Korean to win ATP Tour singles and doubles titles by winning the singles tournament at the Sydney International as a qualifier (beating Juan Carlos Ferrero in the final) and the doubles tournament at the Siebel Open in San Jose, California (partnering with Belarusian Vladimir Voltchkov).

At Wimbledon, he was defeated in the first round by eventual champion Roger Federer in straight sets.

2006
In the second round at Wimbledon, Lee was defeated by former champion and two-time semifinalist Lleyton Hewitt in five sets, including three tie-breakers. Lee had set points in the third set tie-breaker, but went on to lose the set after an incorrect line call. As Lee went on to win the fourth set the call probably prevented him winning the match against the eventual quarterfinalist.

2007

Lee matched his best Grand Slam performance by making the fourth round of the US Open tournament. In the first round, he was forced to five sets before defeating Dominik Hrbatý. Lee was pit against Guillermo Cañas, who was the fourteenth seed in the tournament, in the second round. He defeated Cañas in three sets, setting up a third round showdown against nineteenth seed Andy Murray. Lee got out to a quick two set advantage against Murray, eventually winning in four sets. In the fourth round, Lee played fourth seed Nikolay Davydenko, who defeated the Korean in three sets.

His fourth round showing at the US Open capped a very successful hardcourt series. During the US Open Series, Lee reached the semifinals at the Countrywide Classic in Los Angeles, the quarterfinals at the Indianapolis Tennis Championships and at the Legg Mason Tennis Classic.

Lee set personal bests in a handful of categories, including match wins and money earned. He won a career-high 25 matches and earned $386,230. Overall, Lee compiled records of 16-15 on hard, 5-5 on clay, 3-3 on grass and 1-0 on carpet. In August, he achieved his career best ranking in singles as world No. 36 with the help of his coach, Hee june Choi.

2008
In the 2008 season, Lee had a disappointing losing streak and eventually fell out of the top 100. He did, however, match his best Masters Series result by making the fourth round of Indian Wells, beating Michaël Llodra, Jarkko Nieminen and No. 5 seed David Ferrer along the way.

2009
In 2009, Lee played one final time for Korea, in the Davis Cup Play-off between Korea and China. He announced his retirement from pro tennis after the Davis Cup match, with Korea triumphing 3-2.

Doubles
Lee sometimes played doubles alongside Korean-American player Kevin Kim. The pair reached the third round of the 2005 French Open.

Playing style
Lee is right-handed and uses a single-handed backhand. He considers his backhand as his best shot. His favorite surface is hardcourt. He was coached by countryman and former ATP professional Yoon Yong-il (since March 2006).

ATP career finals

Singles: 2 (1 title, 1 runner-up)

Doubles: 1 (1 title)

ATP Challenger and ITF Futures finals

Singles: 27 (22–5)

Doubles: 22 (14–8)

Performance timelines

Singles

Doubles

Filmography

Television shows

See also
 List of Koreans

References

External links
  Lee Hyung Taik Tennis Academy
 
 
 
 Lee Recent Match Results
 Lee World Ranking History
 Korean Men Recent Match Results
 ATP interview

1976 births
Living people
Olympic tennis players of South Korea
South Korean male tennis players
Tennis players at the 1996 Summer Olympics
Tennis players at the 2000 Summer Olympics
Tennis players at the 2004 Summer Olympics
Tennis players at the 2008 Summer Olympics
Konkuk University alumni
Asian Games medalists in tennis
Tennis players at the 1998 Asian Games
Tennis players at the 2002 Asian Games
Tennis players at the 2006 Asian Games
Asian Games gold medalists for South Korea
Asian Games silver medalists for South Korea
Medalists at the 1998 Asian Games
Medalists at the 2002 Asian Games
Medalists at the 2006 Asian Games
Universiade medalists in tennis
Universiade gold medalists for South Korea
Universiade silver medalists for South Korea
Medalists at the 1995 Summer Universiade
Medalists at the 1997 Summer Universiade
Medalists at the 1999 Summer Universiade
People from Hoengseong County